Lindsay James may refer to:
 Lindsay James (politician), member of the Iowa House of Representatives
 Lindsay James (softball), Greek softball player
 Lindsay James (Waterloo Road)